Nader Mashayekhi (born November 26, 1958 in Tehran) is an Iranian composer. From 2006 to July 2007 he was conductor of the Tehran Symphony Orchestra. He is the son of Jamshid Mashayekhi.

Mashayekhi studied under Roman Haubenstock-Ramati at the University of Music and Performing Arts, Vienna.

In the 1990s he was music director of the Austrian new music ensemble "Wien 2001".

His works have been performed by Klangforum Wien (1992–95), Ensemble Work in Progress, Berlin (1993), Ensemble Zwischen Töne, Berlin (1997–2000), Savarian Symphony Orchestra (1997), Radio Symphony Orchestra, Vienna (1998), and the Tehran Symphony Orchestra (1998–2000).

References

External links
 A review on Nader Mashayekhi's performance in 2006

1958 births
Iranian classical composers
Iranian conductors (music)
Living people
People from Tehran
University of Music and Performing Arts Vienna alumni
21st-century conductors (music)